Tricity, or Tri-City is a metropolitan area in Pomeranian Voivodeship, Poland, consisting of three contiguous coastal cities in Pomerelia forming a row on the coastline of the Gdańsk Bay, Baltic Sea, namely the cities of Gdańsk, Gdynia, and Sopot, along with other cities and towns in their vicinity. In 2021, the three core cities were inhabited by 749 786 people, while the Tricity together with its metropolitan area had a combined population of between 1 and 1.5 million, depending on the definition of the boundaries of the latter.

The designation has been used informally or semi-formally only. A strategic cooperation declaration, the Tricity Charter (Polish: Karta Trójmiasta), was signed by the three city mayors on 28 March 2007. The only incorporated common management authority in the Tricity metro is the Gdańsk Bay Public Transport Metropolitan Union which is, despite the name, an inter-municipal union and not a metropolitan one.

Economy 
Nearly 35% of taxpayers from Tricity are in the middle and high taxable income groups (average for Poland 10%). Approximately 12% of Tricity taxpayers are in the highest taxable income group (Polish average 3%).

Population 
The total population of the 3 cities comprising Tricity (Gdańsk + Gdynia + Sopot):
 XII.1960: 481,100 inhabitants (286,900 + 150,200 + 44,000)
 XII.1970: 604,800 inhabitants (365,600 + 191,500 + 47,700)
 XII.1975: 693,800 inhabitants (421,000 + 221,100 + 51,700)
 XII.1980: 744,400 inhabitants (456,700 + 236,400 + 51,300)
 XII.2004: 754,960 inhabitants (460,524 + 253,650 + 40,785)
 XII.2006: 748,126 inhabitants (456,658 + 251,844 + 39,624)
 XII.2019: 752,954 inhabitants (470,907 + 246,348 + 35,719)
 XII.2021: 749,786 inhabitants (470,633 + 244,104 + 35,049)
The Tricity metropolitan area also includes Wejherowo, Reda, Rumia, Pruszcz Gdański, and several other communities. The total population in 2006 was 1,100,500, in an area of 1580.69 km2.

 Largest urban areas of the European Union
 Largest European metropolitan areas

The Tricity continuous urban area includes following cities:

According to official EU publication the population of Larger Urban Zone of Tricity is 1,098,379.

Education 

The Tricity is an important center of education.
 Gdańsk: Number of universities: 13 (2010) Number of students: 52,436 (2009) Number of graduates: 10,439 (2001)
 Gdynia: Number of universities: 7 (2010) Number of students: 21,362 (2010)

Some of the universities in the Tricity:
 Academy of Physical Education in Gdańsk
 Academy of Fine Arts in Gdańsk
 Academy of Music in Gdańsk
 Gdynia Maritime University
 Polish Naval Academy in Gdynia
 Medical University of Gdańsk
 University of Gdańsk
 Gdańsk University of Technology
 SWPS University in Sopot
 Sopot University of Applied Sciences
 Gdańsk School of Banking
 Gdańsk Management College
 Gdańsk Higher School of Humanities
 Gdańsk Administration School
 Social Economic Higher School in Gdańsk
 The Higher School of Tourism and Hotel Industry in Gdańsk
 Academy of International Economic and Political Relations in Gdynia
 Kwiatkowski University of Business and Administration in Gdynia
 Pomeranian Higher School of Humanities in Gdynia
 The Higher School of Physical Culture and Tourism in Sopot
 Sopot College

Entertainment 

Cinemas:

 Gdańsk Film Centre (studio cinemas; all three closed in 2015)
 Helikon
 Kameralne
 Neptun
 Helios Gdynia
 Kameralne Cafe
 Kinoplex
 Multikino Gdynia (closed in 2018)
 Multikino Gdańsk
 Multikino Sopot
 Multikino Rumia
 Polonia
 Żak

Theatres:

 Wybrzeże Theatre
 Danuta Baduszkowa Musical Theatre in Gdynia
 Witold Gombrowicz Municipal Theatre in Gdynia
 Atelier Theatre in Sopot
 Dreams Theatre
 Miniatura Theatre in Gdańsk
 Theatre Znak in Gdańsk
 Wybrzeżak Theatre
 Gdańsk Shakespeare Theatre
 Scena Kameralna Teatru Wybrzeże
 Summer Scene of Gdynia's Municipal Theatre
 Scena Teatralna ŻAK
 Theatrum Gedanense Foundation

Opera house and Philharmonic

 Forest Opera in Sopot
 Frederic Chopin Polish Baltic Philharmonic
 Polska Filharmonia Kameralna in Sopot
 The Baltic Opera

Museums and art galleries

 Gdańsk City Gallery
 Chodowiecki and Grass House
 Państwowa Galeria Sztuki in Sopot
 National Museum
 Zbrojownia Sztuki
 Art Cybernetics Institute (ICS)
 CSW Łaźnia
 Art Lab Wyspa
 multiple small noninstitutional galleries (Galeria UL, Tajna Galeria, Brama Wyżynna, KIT)
 Museum of the Second World War

Climate 

Tricity has a temperate climate with warm summers and cold winters that can be very severe. Rain is possible all year round. Summer is the best time to visit when temperatures range from 70 °F to 90 °F (20 °C to 30 °C), but evenings can be cool enough to require a sweater. Winters are wet, cold and grey.

Sport

Tricity has a number of professional teams, which compete in basketball, volleyball, speedway, handball, rugby union and football.

The most known football clubs, contesting the Tricity Derby, are Lechia Gdańsk and Arka Gdynia.

Both clubs also possess highly successful rugby teams, RC Arka, who play at the National Rugby Stadium and RC Lechia. There is a third top-flight Polish rugby team Ogniwo Sopot, making the Tricity Poland's rugby capital. 

The third football club is Bałtyk Gdynia, in the past also a multi-sports club with over 20 different sections.

Wybrzeże Gdańsk are the Tricity's speedway team, formerly a multi-sports club, now its only other remaining section is the reactivated handball team, former ten-times men's Polish champions.

Arka also fields a men's and women's professional basketball team while Trefl Sopot is the other men's professional basketball club in the Tricity.

Stoczniowiec Gdańsk is the local ice hockey team.

Transport 

The Tricity has a well-developed traffic infrastructure and public transport system. Development of the Tricity was smoothed by the construction of the rapid transit rail (SKM) 1951, binding the whole area from Tczew by Gdańsk, Sopot 1953, Gdynia 1956, Reda, Rumia to Wejherowo 1957. In 1975, the Tricity Beltway was constructed.

The Gdańsk Bay Public Transport Metropolitan Union (MZKZG), a body incorporated by the municipalities in the area to act as a common public transport authority, issues tickets valid both for the SKM Rapid Transit Rail, as well as for all or some of the trams and buses in Gdańsk or trolleybuses and buses in Sopot and Gdynia.

Road transport
The backbone of the Tricity is the inner highway. It starts in Gdańsk and goes through Sopot, Gdynia, Rumia and Reda to Wejherowo. It consists of 2-4 lanes in each direction. 

The dual carriageway Tricity Beltway (Obwodnica Trójmiejska) starts in the vicinity of Pruszcz Gdański and goes through the western districts of Gdańsk to Gdynia-Chylonia.

Trolleybus, bus and coach
The variety and number of public bus lines and coach connections facilitates the travel around the Tricity and surrounding areas. One of the most popular means of transport in the Pomerania province is the public coach. The high number of bus lines covers every quarter of the three cities within the metropolis. In addition to usual buses, the cities of Gdynia and Sopot also operate trolleybuses.

Rail transport

Tramway
The city of Gdańsk operates a well-developed tram system.

Tricity Rapid Transit Rail 
The Tricity area is served by the SKM rail network (known in Polish as Szybka Kolej Miejska w Trójmieście or "Tricity Rapid Transit Rail"). It currently provides regular service primarily on two dedicated railways complemented by some of the ordinary railways in the region, both as a commuter rail connecting some of the peripheral towns and villages with each other and with the principal cities of Gdańsk, Gdynia and Sopot, as well as internal rapid transit service within the urban core formed by the three cities. The intervals range from every 6 minutes during peak time on the main common section between Gdańsk and Gdynia to 30 minutes at the farthest ends. 

The rapid transit rail network has achieved since its inception in 1951 a unifying effect on the metro area formerly divided by a frontier, by linking the connected localities with a frequent and reliable service. More recently, a pre-war railway destroyed in 1945 by the retreating German army has been reconstructed as the  19.5 km Pomorska Kolej Metropolitalna (Pomeranian Metropolitan Railway) or PKM line, also been operated by the SKM, and put into service in 2015, providing connection of the downtown station of Gdańsk Wrzeszcz Station with the Gdańsk Lech Wałęsa Airport, with further service to the Gdynia Główna Station provided via an earlier existing railway, thus forming a loop connected to the primary SKM line directly at its southern terminus, while the northern terminus is connected indirectly through an earlier existing line. The primary SKM line has been served by overhead-powered electrical multiple units since its inauguration, while the PKM line is currently serviced by oil-powered units, though it is scheduled for imminent electrification.

Regional rail connections and remote rail destinations 
The area is well connected to the rest of the Pomerania region, as well as Poland and the rest of Europe. Polregio network provides a regional rail service connecting the cities and towns of the Pomerania. Gdańsk Główny and Gdynia Glowna serve as major rail hubs for the area, with these stations and five others, Gdańsk Wrzeszcz, Gdańsk Oliwa, Sopot, Wejherowo and Rumia 
offering inter-city services to cities around Poland and in other countries, operated by Polish State Railways under the PKP Intercity branding. Most of the stations that are served by regional and inter-city rail are also part of the above-mentioned SKM network.

Air transport 

Gdańsk Lech Wałęsa Airport is one of the three busiest Polish international airports. Its position is associated with a well-developed network of domestic and international transport connections provided in response to the growing demand for business and tourist travel.

The Gdańsk Airport is located a mere 10 km from the centre of Gdańsk, about the same distance from the centre of Sopot and 23 km from the centre of Gdynia. The continually expanding road system which connects the airport with the city centres allows drivers to cover the distances in about 15–20 minutes. The close vicinity of the Tri-city by-pass and junctions with state motorways nos. 1, 6 and 7 facilitates access from areas outside the Tri-city. The convenient location of the airport makes it easy for travellers and cargo carriers to transfer from air to road, and also to the railway network and seaports. Gdańsk Lech Walesa Airport has its own railway siding which can be used for handling large lots of cargo dispatched by air.

The efficient Gdańsk Airport operates even the biggest planes and allows thousands of tourists to visit the Pomerania province every day. Just in front of the main entrance to the passenger terminal, the visitors can find a bus that will take them to the city centre.
There are frequent SKM trains running from the train station in front of the airport to Gdynia, Gdańsk Wrzeszcz, Kartuzy and Koscierzyna. A passenger may also choose to take a taxi.

A failed attempt was undertaken to partially repurpose the Military Gdynia-Kosakowo Airport into a dual-use military and civil one.

Scheduled passenger destinations 
 Ålesund (WizzAir)
 Aarhus (Eurolot)
 Aberdeen (WizzAir)
 Amsterdam (Eurolot)
 Belfast (EasyJet)
 Barcelona Girona (WizzAir)
 Birmingham (Ryanair)
 Bournemouth (WizzAir)
 Bremen (Eurolot)
 Bristol (EasyJet)
 Cardiff (bmibaby)
 Cologne / Bonn (WizzAir)
 Copenhagen (SAS and Ryanair)
 Cork (Ryanair)
 Coventry (WizzAir)
 Doncaster Sheffield (WizzAir)
 Dortmund (WizzAir)
 Dublin (Ryanair)
 East Midlands Airport (bmibaby)
 Eindhoven (WizzAir)
 Frankfurt (LOT, Lufthansa)
 Frankfurt Hahn (Ryanair)
 Glasgow Prestwick (WizzAir)
 Gothenburg (WizzAir)
 Hamburg Lubeck (WizzAir)
 Haugesund (WizzAir)
 Helsinki (Finnair)
 Iraklion (LOT)
 Karlskrona Ronneby
 Katowice (Eurolot)
 Kraków (Eurolot)
 Leeds Bradford Airport (Ryanair)
 Liverpool (WizzAir)
 London Gatwick Airport (EasyJet)
 London Luton Airport (WizzAir)
 London Stansted Airport (Ryanair)
 Malmö Airport (WizzAir)
 Munich (LOT)
 Oslo (Norwegian, SAS)
 Oslo Torp (WizzAir)
 Poprad (Eurolot)
 Salzburg (Eurolot)
 Stockholm Skavsta Airport (WizzAir)
 Turku (WizzAir)
 Vilnius (AirBaltic)
 Warsaw (LOT)

Maritime transport

Scheduled ferry lines
 Gdynia - Karlskrona - Gdynia (Stena Line)
 Gdynia - Hanko (Finnlines)- freight service only
 Gdańsk - Nynashamn - Gdańsk (Polferries)

Foreign representatives

Gdańsk:

 Consul of the Kingdom of Denmark
 General Consulate of China
 General Consulate of Russia
 General Consulate of the Republic of Belarus
 General Consulate of the Federal Republic of Germany
 General Consulate of Ukraine
 Honorary Consul of the Federal Democratic Republic of Ethiopia
 Honorary Consul of the United Kingdom of Great Britain and Northern Ireland
 Honorary Consul of the Republic of Latvia
 Honorary Consul of the Republic of Lithuania
 Honorary Consul of the United Mexican States
 Honorary Consul of the Kingdom of the Netherlands
 Honorary Consul of Peru
 Honorary Consul of the Kingdom of Spain

Gdynia:

 General Consulate of the Kingdom of Sweden
 General Consulate of Romania
 Honorary Consul of the Czech Republic
 Honorary Consul of the Republic of Finland
 Honorary Consul of Italy
 Honorary Consul of Azerbaijan
 Honorary Consul of the Republic of Austria
 Honorary Consul of Chile
 Honorary Consul of the Republic of Cyprus
 Honorary Consul of the People's Republic of Bangladesh
 Honorary Consul of the Kingdom of Norway
 Honorary Consul of France

Sopot:

 General Consulate of the Republic of Iceland
 Honorary Consul of the Republic of Slovakia

See also
 Metropolitan areas in Poland
 Kashubia
 Little Kashubian Tricity, which lies directly northwest of Tricity
 Tricity Landscape Park

References

External links 

 Virtual Tour on beautiful Coast in Gdynia-Orlowo
 Gdańsk transport system (PL, ENG)
 Gdynia transport system (PL)
 SKM (Fast Urban Railway) - map (PL)
 Tricity Public Communication Timetables
 Map and Guide to agglomeration (PL, ENG)
 Map of population density in the urban area
 Tricity for tourists from Scandinavia (ENG)
 City of Gdynia (PL, ENG, DE, SWE, DEN, FR, RU)
 City of Sopot (PL, ENG, DE, FR, RU)
 City of Gdańsk (PL, ENG)
 Pomeranian Voivodeship Tourist Portal (PL, ENG, DE, FR, RU)
 City break in Tricity (ENG)
 Pomeranian Science and Technology Park in Gdynia (PL, ENG, DE, FR, IT, DEN)

Metropolitan areas of Poland
Geography of Pomeranian Voivodeship
Gdańsk
Gdynia
Sopot